Marina Rachel Picciotto (born June 22, 1963) is an American neuroscientist known for her work on the role of nicotine in addiction, memory, and reward behaviors. She is the Charles B. G. Murphy Professor of Psychiatry and professor in the Child Study Center and the Departments of Neuroscience and of Pharmacology at the Yale University School of Medicine. Since 2015, she has been editor-in-chief of the Journal of Neuroscience.

Education and early life
Born in Bloomington, Indiana on June 22, 1963, Picciotto moved to New York City as a young child and graduated from Hunter College High School in 1981. Picciotto received her B.S. in biology from Stanford University in 1985, and her Ph.D. in 1992 from Rockefeller University. She carried out post-doctoral work at the Pasteur Institute in Paris from 1992-1995.

Scientific career
Picciotto began her career in neuroscience as an undergraduate researcher at Stanford University, where she worked with Richard Scheller. There she discovered that the FMRFamide gene gives rise to multiple copies of the neuropeptide. She went on to PhD work with Paul Greengard at Rockefeller University where she cloned the gene for calcium/calmodulin-dependent protein kinase 1. As a Human Frontier Science Program postdoctoral fellow with Jean-Pierre Changeux at the Pasteur Institute in Paris, Picciotto produced the first mouse knock-out lacking a nicotinic receptor subunit. She returned to the United States in 1995 to join the Yale University faculty as an assistant professor and rising through the ranks to become the Charles B.G. Murphy Professor in Psychiatry in 2008. Her group is known for its discoveries in nicotine addiction and brain circuits. Recent work from Picciotto showed that pre-natal exposure to nicotine has profound effects on adult behavior. In press interviews, she has expressed concerns about the use of e-cigarettes and low-dose nicotine cigarettes.

Editorial
In 2015, Picciotto was named editor-in-chief of The Journal of Neuroscience. Since taking over leadership at the journal, she has instituted a number of changes including eliminating submission fees for Society for Neuroscience members and restoring the ability of authors to publish supplementary data alongside their papers. Picciotto has also instituted new controls on statistical analysis and experimental design reporting. In a move to support pre-print publishing, Picciotto added The Journal of Neuroscience to the list of journals that will accept submissions directly from bioRxiv. She has also started initiatives on social media to thank scientists who participate in peer review at the journal.

Awards
President Bill Clinton presented Picciotto with the Presidential Early Career Award for Scientists and Engineers at the White House in 2000. She received the Jacob P. Waletzky Memorial Award for Innovative Research in Drug Addiction and Alcohol Research from The Society for Neuroscience in 2007. Picciotto was elected as an AAAS fellow of the American Association for the Advancement of Science in 2014, and was elected to the National Academy of Medicine in 2012. In 2019, Picciotto was among 11 scientists awarded the National Institutes of Health’s Pioneer Award. That same year, she was awarded the Bernice Grafstein award for advancing the careers of women in neuroscience.

Selected publications

References

External links

1963 births
Living people
Members of the National Academy of Medicine
Yale University faculty
American women neuroscientists
American neuroscientists
Rockefeller University alumni
Stanford University alumni
Hunter College High School alumni
American women scientists
Scientists from New York (state)